Dudley is an unincorporated community located in the town of Russell, Lincoln County, Wisconsin, United States. The community was founded by businessman Henry Dudley as a waystation between Wausau, Wisconsin and lumber camps further north.

Notes

Unincorporated communities in Lincoln County, Wisconsin
Unincorporated communities in Wisconsin